Brazosport is an unincorporated community in Brazoria County, Texas, United States. According to the Handbook of Texas, the community had a population of 61,198 in 2000. It is located within the Greater Houston metropolitan area.

History
Brazosport is a 214-square-mile urbanized industrial and port area. According to some sources, the popular name was first used in eighteenth-century nautical charts. Brazosport shares a chamber of commerce with local economically linked municipalities—Clute, Freeport, Lake Barbara, Richwood, and Lake Jackson—and small towns—Jones Creek, Oyster Creek, Quintana, Surfside, Gulf Park, Bryan Beach, Perry's Landing, and Bastrop Bayou. Port facilities, sulfur mines, and the chemical industry were largely responsible for rapid growth in the community after the Dow Chemical Company arrived in 1939. By 1990, the firm employed almost 11,000 people. The Brazos River Harbor Navigation District was established in 1925 to govern the development of Port Freeport; it opened the harbor on December 11, 1954. The nation's first seawater conversion plant was established in Brazosport in 1959, and in the 1970s, Bryan Mound Salt Dome provided strategic oil reserves for the United States government. The Brazosport resort industry promotes  of beaches and sport and commercial fishing. It is responsible for annual events, including the April Blessing of the Texas Gulf Fleet, the June Sandcastle and Sand Sculpture Contest, Fort Velasco Day, July Fishin' Fiesta and Shrimp Festival, September Shrimp Boil and Auction, and October Sausage Festival. In 1988, a foreign trade zone opened by the Port of Freeport provided access to worldwide markets. Local pacemaker manufacturer Intermedics merged with Sulzer Brothers of Switzerland in that year, bringing new industry to the area. Brazoria Memorial Hospital was dedicated in 1988, and two new county parks, Quintana and Stahlman, opened in the 1990s. In 1945, Brazosport had 23,000 residents. The population rose to 35,000 by 1954, declined briefly in 1956, then rose steadily, despite the severe damage done by Hurricane Carla in 1961. The population in 1990 was 52,258, and in 2000, it was 61,198.

Geography

Education
The Brazosport Independent School District was formed in 1944 and consisted of a high school, five junior high schools, nine elementary schools, and a community college in 1957. Brazosport College opened in the community in 1968 and had 879 students enrolled in it. It later moved to a site two miles closer to Lake Jackson.

References

Unincorporated communities in Brazoria County, Texas
Unincorporated communities in Texas